Goldfarb Seligman & Co., one of Israel's largest law firms, is the product of the July 1, 2011, merger of Goldfarb, Levy, Eran, Meiri & Co. and M. Seligman & Co. Its offices are in Tel Aviv.

The firm is headed by Adv. Yudi Levy, Co-chairman, Managing Partner, and the Chairman of its executive committee.

Goldfarb Seligman employs over 300 attorneys, including over 100 partners, who offer clients a wide spectrum of legal services. The firm focuses on four core practice areas: corporate and capital markets in Israel and overseas; litigation of all types; real estate, planning and construction of all descriptions; and taxation in Israel and internationally. The firm also offers highly specialized practices in industry; labor law; antitrust and competition; infrastructure; regulation; intellectual property and privacy; energy; finance; banking; insurance; environmental law; and more.

In 2023, Goldfarb Seligman & Co. have merged with Gross & Co. to become the country's largest law firm Goldfarb Gross Seligman.

References

External links
 Company website
 Goldfarb, Levy, Eran & Co. (before the merger) Profile, Dun's 100- 2005
 Goldfarb, Levy, Eran, Meiri & Co. Profile, BDI Code- 2006 (PDF file)

Law firms of Israel
Law firms established in 1972